This article deals with the results of the 2006 Canadian federal election in Quebec and Atlantic Canada.

Newfoundland and Labrador

Prince Edward Island

Nova Scotia

New Brunswick

Quebec

Eastern Quebec

Côte-Nord and Saguenay

Quebec City

Central Quebec

Eastern Townships

Montérégie

Eastern Montreal

Western Montreal

Northern Montreal and Laval

Laurentides, Outaouais and Northern Quebec

2006 Canadian federal election
Elections in Quebec
Atlantic Canada